The Buick GL8 is a minivan that is produced by Shanghai GM, a joint-venture between Chinese automaker SAIC Motor and American automaker General Motors. It is only sold in China.

Introduced in 1999, the first generation Buick GL8 is similar to the GM-made minivans that are sold in North America which was marketed under many nameplates, such as the Chevrolet Uplander, Chevrolet Venture, Buick Terraza, Oldsmobile Silhouette, Pontiac Trans Sport, Pontiac Trans Sport Montana, Pontiac Montana, Pontiac Montana SV6, and Saturn Relay. Like the North American GM minivans, it is built on GM's U-body platform, which is also used by the Buick Rendezvous and the Pontiac Aztek crossover SUVs.

A revamped edition was released in late 2010/early 2011, featuring 2.4 L and V6 3.0 L engines. It is based on an old minivan platform, with a completely reworked exterior and interior design. The previous generation was available as the GL8 First Land until 2016.

The third-generation model dubbed the GL8 ES was launched in 2017, with the second generation still available and updated as the GL8 Land Business Class. Both the GL8 ES and GL8 Land Business Class received a facelift with the GL8 ES receiving a Avenir luxury variant.

The fourth-generation model called the GL8 Century was launched in 2022, with the second and third generation models both available and updated to be sold alongside the GL8 Century, resulting in a 3-generation lineup with the latter two generations both available with an Avenir luxury trim level.


First generation (2000) 

The GL8 first entered production in China in December 1999. There are five trim levels available, called the LT, CT1, CT2, CT3 and GT (which is only available on the First Land). The regular wheelbase GL8 is known as the GL8 2.5, while the extended wheelbase variant of the GL8 is known as the GL8 First Land. Pricing ranged between 218,000 to 318,000 yuan (31,920 to 46,570 USD).

Starting from October 2001, the GL8 was exported to the Philippines, where it was rebadged as the Chevrolet Venture and available in a 10-seater configuration until 2005. Although reviews and sales were generally lukewarm, build quality was subpar and parts availability was also a source of persistent frustration for Venture owners in the Philippines. Its local competitors include the Hyundai Starex and the Kia Carnival which had better build quality. The Chevrolet Venture was sold in the Philippine market up until 2006, although some remaining units were sold in dealerships up until 2007.

The Venture is one out of two rebadged Chinese-market Buicks sold in the Philippines, the other being the Buick Regal-based Chevrolet Lumina. Both are sourced from Shanghai GM.

Pre-facelift styling

In 2005, the GL8 underwent a facelift for the 2006 model year, receiving a redesigned front end and simplified cladding. The GL8 First Land was also introduced, with a brand-new front end design and clear taillights. The GL8 was then given a second facelift for the 2010 model year with a design similar to the GL8 First Land.

Production of the first generation GL8 ended in 2016.

Post-facelift styling

Engines:
 GL8 Business Edition: LE5 2.4 L I4
 GL8 2.5: LB8 2.5 L V6
 GL8 First Land: LW9 3.0 L V6

Hybrid Prototype 
In 2001, the Buick GL8 XEA1 or Phoenix was developed as a collaboration between General Motors and Shanghai Automotive Industry Corporation (SAIC). The Buick GL8 XAE1 is a hybrid vehicle that uses a 35 kW fuel cell and compressed hydrogen gas to deliver its power. The General Motors Phoenix was officially unveiled at the Pan Asia Automotive Technology Center in China in 2001.

Second generation (2010) 

Introduced in 2010 for the 2011 model year, the GL8 II has an all-new appearance inspired by the Buick Business concept car that was shown in 2009, with a drastic dip in the beltline. The wheelbase is the same as for the GL8 First Land, . Developed by the Pan-Asia Technical Automotive Center (PATAC), another joint venture of SAIC Motors with General Motors, the vehicle is based on a vehicle architecture of over a decade old.

Engines include a 2.4-liter DVVT Ecotec four-cylinder and a 3.0-liter V6, with an available six-speed automatic gearbox for the V6. To differentiate the new GL8 from its predecessor which remains on sale as a "Business Edition", the new one is sold as the "Luxury Business Edition".

After the third generation GL8 on sale, to differentiate the new GL8 (third generation GL8) from its predecessor which remains on sale as a "Business Edition", the new one is sold as the "Luxury Business Edition". And it has a new engine called LCV, a 2.5-liter DVVT Ecotec. But the old 3.0-liter V6 was canceled. 

Pre-facelift styling

Post-facelift styling

This generation GL8 was given a facelift in May 2020 with a new exterior known as the "Land Business Edition" and had a single trim level on offer known as the 652T. The 2 litre LSY turbocharged petrol engine is standard paired with the 9-speed Hydramatic automatic gearbox. Twelve models are available and pricing ranges from 232,900 yuan to 529,900 yuan (33,320 to 75,820 USD - July 2020 exchange rate).  

Second facelift styling

The second generation GL8 or GL8 Land Business Edition received another facelift in 2022 launched alongside the 2022 facelifted GL8 ES (third generation) and the freshly introduced GL8 Century (fourth generation).

Third facelift styling

Third generation (2017) 

The third generation Buick GL8 debuted in China in October 2016 dubbed the GL8 ES and was sold alongside the second generation model. 

The Buick GL8 ES received a complete exterior overhaul using the newly introduced winged Buick grille treatment, as well as a redesigned roofline. The entire engine lineup was replaced by a 2.0-liter turbocharged inline-four producing . 

The last generation was sold as 25S with a 2.5-liter I4 in the new base model. The new version is based on an updated version of the same platform, abandoning the current torsion beam rear suspension in favor of a new independent setup. The entry-level price was lowered to RMB 229,000 for the old GL8 25S, while a luxury version, the most expensive GL8 Avenir, at RMB 449,000.

2020 facelift

Originally revealed as the Buick GL8 Avenir concept during the 2019 Shanghai Auto Show, the production GL8 and GL8 Avenir facelift was revealed in March 2020. The GL8 facelift is available with a four-seat layout, six-seat layout, and seven-seat configurations. Technology is a significant focus for the post-facelift GL8, including the 12.3-inch integrated display and Buick’s eConnect 3.0 connectivity technology and head-up display. 

Post-facelift styling

The third generation GL8 or GL8 ES and Avenir received another facelift in 2022 launched alongside the 2022 facelifted GL8 Land Business Edition (second generation) and the freshly introduced GL8 Century (fourth generation).

Second facelift styling

Fourth generation (2022) 
{{Infobox automobile
| name = Fourth generation
| image = BUICK GL8 CENTURY (BUICK GL8 FOURTH GENENRATION) China.jpg
| caption = Buick GL8 Century
| aka = Buick GL8 Century
| engine = 

The fourth generation Buick GL8 was unveiled in August 2022 and is now called the Buick GL8 Century. The GL8 Century was previewed by the Buick GL8 Flagship Concept. It is the first Buick to adopt the new Pure Design philosophy, which will be seen in next-gen Buick models. 

The GL8 Century is available in three models: the base GL8 Century, the mid-range GL8 Century Avenir, and the top-of-the-line GL8 Century Flagship. Both the base model and Avenir are available in single tone paint, while the Flagship is available in two-tone with a special paint treatment. The base model and Avenir are available in 7-seat and 6-seat configurations respectively, with the Flagship available with 4-seat configuration. 

On the exterior, the front consists of shark-nose-like styling, a large trapezoid grille, and dual-direction headlights with a redesigned light signature. The rear features full width taillights. The base model features slightly different styling from the Avenir and Flagship. The GL8 Century is the first production model to wear Buick's new corporate emblem.

On the interior of the Flagship, there are only four seats, like in other luxury minivans in the segment. The front and rear are separated by a divider equipped with a 32" screen flanked with Bose speakers on both sides. Storage drawers are equipped below the screen. The heated captain's chairs are upholstered in Nappa-leather and feature 18-way power adjustment, ottomans, and are equipped with Bose speakers in the headrests. The infotainment system and seats are controlled by an 8-inch touchscreen. Other features include a 21-speaker Bose Executive Edition sound system, 5G internet connectivity, Apple CarPlay, and Baidu CarLife. The roof features a starry evening sky headliner, comparable to that of Rolls-Royce's Starlight Headliner.

Much like the previous generation GL8s, the GL8 Century will be sold exclusively in China. The GL8 Century Avenir and Flagship will go on sale in late 2022, with the base model to go on sale at a later date.

References

External links 

  

GL8
Minivans
Flagship vehicles
Cars of China
Front-wheel-drive vehicles
2010s cars
Cars introduced in 2000